Mondeku is a monotypic genus of east African jumping spiders containing the single species, Mondeku albopilosum. It was first described by G. N. Azarkina and C. R. Haddad in 2020, and it has only been found in Kenya.

See also
 List of Salticidae genera

References

Monotypic Salticidae genera
Arthropods of Kenya